Route nationale 1a (RN 1a) is a secondary highway in Madagascar, running from Maintirano to Tsiroanomandidy. It crosses the region of Bongolava and Melaky

Selected locations on route
(west to east)
Maintirano 
Amparihimanga
Tsiroanomandidy  - (intersection with RN 1a to Maintirano and RN 1b )

See also
List of roads in Madagascar
Transport in Madagascar

References

Roads in Bongolava
 Roads in Melaky
Roads in Madagascar